The Union of Commercial and Industrial Workers is a trade union in Trinidad and Tobago which was once one of the major unions organising shop workers. It has since diminished in both size and significance.

See also

 List of trade unions

Trade unions in Trinidad and Tobago